The 1973–74 Vancouver Blazers season was the second season of operation for the World Hockey Association (WHA) franchise. The team had operated in Philadelphia the previous season before moving to Vancouver. The Blazers did not qualify for the playoffs.

Offseason

Regular season

Final standings

Game log

Player stats

Note: Pos = Position; GP = Games played; G = Goals; A = Assists; Pts = Points; +/- = plus/minus; PIM = Penalty minutes; PPG = Power-play goals; SHG = Short-handed goals; GWG = Game-winning goals
      MIN = Minutes played; W = Wins; L = Losses; T = Ties; GA = Goals-against; GAA = Goals-against average; SO = Shutouts;

Awards and records

Transactions

Draft picks
Vancouver's draft picks at the 1973 WHA Amateur Draft.

Farm teams

See also
1973–74 WHA season

References

External links

Van
Van